The 1993–94 League of Ireland First Division season was the 9th season of the League of Ireland First Division.

Overview
The First Division was contested by 10 teams and Sligo Rovers F.C. won the division. Under player manager Willie McStay and with a team that also included Riccardo Gabbiadini and Eddie Annand, Rovers also completed a treble when they won the First Division Shield and the FAI Cup.

Final table

Promotion/relegation play-off
Third placed Finn Harps F.C. played off against Cobh Ramblers F.C. who finished in tenth place in the 1993–94 League of Ireland Premier Division. The winner would compete in the 1994–95 League of Ireland Premier Division.

1st Leg

2nd Leg

Cobh Ramblers F.C. won 3–1 on aggregate and retain their place in the Premier Division

Notes

See also
 1993–94 League of Ireland Premier Division

References

League of Ireland First Division seasons
2
Ireland